Yuri Evgenievich Lyapkin (born January 21, 1945) is a Russian former professional ice hockey defenceman.

Biography
Lyapkin is Jewish. He played in the Soviet Hockey League for Khimik Voskresensk and HC Spartak Moscow. He won a gold medal playing for the undefeated Soviet Union team at the 1976 Olympics. He also won world championships with the Soviet team in 1970/71, 72/73, 73/74, and 74/75, and a silver medal in 75/76.

He was inducted into the Russian and Soviet Hockey Hall of Fame in 1973. He was inducted into the International Jewish Sports Hall of Fame in 2020.

See also
List of select Jewish ice hockey players

References

External links
 
 Russian and Soviet Hockey Hall of Fame bio
 
 
 

1945 births
HC Khimik Voskresensk players
HC Spartak Moscow players
Ice hockey players at the 1976 Winter Olympics
Jewish ice hockey players
Living people
Medalists at the 1976 Winter Olympics
Oji Eagles players
Olympic gold medalists for the Soviet Union
Olympic ice hockey players of the Soviet Union
Olympic medalists in ice hockey
People from Balashikha
Soviet ice hockey defencemen
Soviet expatriate ice hockey players
Soviet Jews
Russian Jews
International Jewish Sports Hall of Fame inductees
Sportspeople from Moscow Oblast
Soviet expatriates in Japan